Sigurd Knolls is an isolated rock knolls at the north end of Otter Plain, about 20 miles (32 km) northwest of Drygalski Mountains in Queen Maud Land. Plotted from surveys and air photos by the Norwegian Antarctic Expedition (1956–60) and named for Sigurd Helle, geodesist and leader of Norwegian Antarctic Expedition (1956–60).

Rock formations of Queen Maud Land
Princess Astrid Coast